Foros de Arrão is a village and a civil parish of the municipality of Ponte de Sor, Portugal. The population in 2011 was 919, in an area of 84.26 km2.

References

Freguesias of Ponte de Sor